Carolyn Rovee-Collier (April 7, 1942 – October 2, 2014) was a Professor of Psychology at Rutgers University. Born in Nashville, Tennessee, she was a pioneer and an internationally renowned expert in cognitive development. She was named one of the 10 most influential female graduates of Brown University. The International Society for Developmental Psychobiology awards the Rovee-Collier Mentor Award in her honor.

Biography
Rovee-Collier grew up in Baton Rouge, Louisiana. She graduated from Louisiana State University in 1962 with a bachelor's degree in psychology. She obtained her master's degree in 1964 and her Ph.D. in experimental child psychology from Brown University in 1966. She taught at Trenton University and then Rutgers university, where she was on the faculty for 43 years until her death on October 2, 2014, after a long struggle with multiple sclerosis and breast cancer, in her Stockton, New Jersey home.

Research
Rovee-Collier was recognized as the founder of infant long-term memory research. Her research focused on learning and memory in pre-verbal infants. In her research, she used operant and deferred imitation procedures to study latent learning, and how memory retrieval affects future retention. Rovee-Collier had authored 200 articles and chapters and a 2001 book (with Hayne and Colombo), The development of implicit and explicit memory, and received recognition for her research accomplishments from various organizations.

Awards
Rovee-Collier received a 10-year NIMH MERIT award. Recipients of these awards are nominated by members of the National Institute of Mental Health, and made to investigators who have demonstrated superior competence and outstanding productivity in their research.

In 2003 she received the Howard Crosby Warren Medal —the most prestigious award in American psychology, according to the Federation of Associations in Behavioral & Brain Sciences. She also received a James McKeen Cattell Fellowship and a Distinguished Achievement Medal from the Graduate School of Brown University.

Selected works 

 Rovee-Collier, C. (1995). Time windows in cognitive development. Developmental Psychology, 31(2), 147–169.
 Rovee-Collier, C. (1997). Dissociations in infant memory: Rethinking the development of implicit and explicit memory. Psychological Review, 104(3), 467–498.
 Rovee-Collier, C., Griesler, P. C., & Earley, L. A. (1985). Contextual determinants of retrieval in three-month-old infants. Learning and Motivation, 16(2), 139–157.
 Rovee-Collier, C. K., Hayne, H., & Colombo, M. (2001). The development of implicit and explicit memory. John Benjamins Publishing.
 Rovee-Collier, C. K., & Sullivan, M. W. (1980). Organization of infant memory. Journal of Experimental Psychology: Human Learning and Memory, 6(6), 798–807.
 Rovee-Collier, C. K., Sullivan, M. W., Enright, M., Lucas, D., & Fagen, J. W. (1980). Reactivation of infant memory. Science, 208(4448), 1159–1161.

References

American women psychologists
20th-century American psychologists
Developmental psychologists
American cognitive scientists
Cognitive development researchers
Fellows of the Society of Experimental Psychologists
Brown University alumni
Louisiana State University alumni
Rutgers University faculty
Deaths from multiple sclerosis
Neurological disease deaths in New Jersey
Deaths from breast cancer
Deaths from cancer in New Jersey
People from Stockton, New Jersey
2014 deaths
1942 births
American women academics
21st-century American women
Scientists with disabilities